{{DISPLAYTITLE:C21H32O3}}
The molecular formula C21H32O3 (molar mass: 332.48 g/mol) may refer to:

 Alfaxalone
 Androstenediol 3β-acetate
 Androstenediol 17β-acetate
 BNN-27
 Dihydrodeoxycorticosterone
 Dihydrotestosterone acetate
 Hydroxydione, a neurosteroid
 Hydroxypregnenolones
 17α-Hydroxypregnenolone
 21-Hydroxypregnenolone
 Hydroxyhexahydrocannabinols
 9-Hydroxyhexahydrocannabinol
 11-Hydroxyhexahydrocannabinol
 Oxymetholone
 5α-Pregnan-17α-ol-3,20-dione